The 2001 Acropolis Rally (formally the 48th Acropolis Rally) was the seventh round of the 2001 World Rally Championship. The race was held over three days between 15 June and 17 June 2001, and was won by Ford's Colin McRae, his 3rd win in a row and 23rd win in the World Rally Championship.

Background

Entry list

Itinerary
All dates and times are EEST (UTC+3).

Results

Overall

World Rally Cars

Classification

Special stages

Championship standings

FIA Cup for Production Rally Drivers

Classification

Special stages

Championship standings

FIA Cup for Super 1600 Drivers

Classification

Special stages

Championship standings

References

External links 
 Official website of the World Rally Championship

Greece
Acropolis Rally
2001 in Greek sport